John Walford Todd (16 May 1912 in Middleton, Greater Manchester – 4 April 1989 in Farnham, Surrey) was an English physician and medical author.

Early years
John Todd, known to his family as "Jack", was born in Middleton, 16 May 1912, youngest child (jointly with his twin sister, Joan) of James Jackson Todd and his wife Winifred Mary Todd née Winter. When he was a small boy the family moved to Hazel Grove, Stockport. He was educated at Manchester Grammar School and then gained a scholarship to study at the Middlesex Hospital Medical School where he graduated MBBS in 1935. He obtained his MRCP in 1938 and MD in 1939.

Wartime and after
From 1939 to 1942 he was Resident Medical Officer at the Middlesex Hospital. This was during the Blitz, from which however he escaped unscathed. In 1942 he joined the RAMC and served in India and Burma until the end of the war, after which he was in Sumatra. He rose to the rank of lieutenant colonel, as Officer in Charge of the Medical Division. In 1947, having left the army, he was appointed as consultant physician at Farnham Hospital. In 1974 he added to this a similar appointment at Frimley Park Hospital. He retained these posts until retirement in 1977.

Books and articles
He had begun to write material intended for publication while still in the army, leading to:
 
described by reviewer L. J. Witts as "The pastoral side of medicine". 
Further books and numerous articles followed, including:
(as editor) 
with contributions from William E. Clarke, John Forbes, Christopher Hardwick,  C. F. Hawkins, Michael Kremer, A. A. G Lewis, Charles A. St. Hill, Frank H. Scadding, C. C. Thomas and John W. Todd

Some major papers

summarised as "The main errors of medicine are: devising remedies from theory and assuming they must be effective; developing facile aetiological theories, leading in turn to remedies based on theory; failing to look at the patient as a whole (when dealing with chronic complainers) ; and over-valuing technology."
These were key notions that he returned to again and again in his life.

Other professional activities
In 1969 he was elected as a Fellow of the Royal College of Physicians, FRCP.
He was an active member of the BMA and served on occasion as secretary and chairman of the Aldershot and Farnham Division. He often expressed his full support for the NHS and disagreed with the BMA position on such matters as terms of service. Nevertheless in 1988 he was elected as a Fellow of the BMA for his work with them.

In the Farnham community
Todd was active in numerous local groups, for a time as a town councillor. He was at various times chairman of the Bourne Residents Association, chairman of the Farnham Society, vice chairman of the League of Friends of Farnham Hospital, founder chairman of the Farnham branch of the Arthritis and Rheumatism Council, chairman of the Farnham and district group of The Ramblers' Association, and chairman of the West Surrey Centre of the National Trust.

Personal life
He married Dorothy Joyce Young, a former nurse, in 1947. They had four children, two of whom became doctors. He died at his home in Farnham 4 April 1989.

References

1912 births
1989 deaths
People educated at Manchester Grammar School
People from Middleton, Greater Manchester
People from Hazel Grove
English medical writers
20th-century English medical doctors
Royal Army Medical Corps officers
Fellows of the Royal College of Physicians
Fellows of the British Medical Association